was a Japanese composer. His work was part of the music event in the art competition at the 1936 Summer Olympics.

References

1895 births
1971 deaths
Japanese male composers
Musicians from Tokyo
Olympic competitors in art competitions
20th-century Japanese male musicians